Zhang Guohua (October 22, 1914－February 21, 1972) was a Chinese lieutenant general and a politician, serving during the invasion of Tibet and the Sino-Indian War and later as a Communist Party secretary for the Tibet Autonomous Region.

Early life
Zhang Guohua was born in Yongxin, Jiangxi in 1914. He joined the Communist Party of China in 1931.

Career

Tibet campaign

As commander of the Southwest Eighteenth Army Corps of the People's Liberation Army, he led the main attack force in the 1950 Qamdo campaign against Tibetan forces. Zhang was chosen for his special knowledge of Tibetan culture; Mao Zedong did not want to alienate the Tibetans and gave strict instructions "to do united front work" by respecting the local religion and customs. In contrast to the leader of the Northwest Army, Fan Ming, he supported the Dalai Lama and avoided marching into the city after the victory. Zhang seized the position of Secretary of the CPC Tibet Committee from 1950 to 1952, until Mao Zedong, on learning of his power struggle with Fan, replaced him with Zhang Jingwu as Secretary. Still, Zhang headed the Tibet Work Committee, which would negotiate the items in the Seventeen Point Agreement for the Peaceful Liberation of Tibet. Zhang only made passing reference to the negotiations in his memoirs. Zhang would resume his position as secretary from 1965 to 1967.

Sino-Indian War
On October 10, 1962 Zhang attended a meeting of military leaders outside Beijing. There, he endorsed the summary by Zhou Enlai that because India chose to occupy disputed territory with China, instead of peacefully resolving the border demarcation with it like Nepal, Burma, and Mongolia, that "Nehru has closed all roads. This leaves us only with war." As the Commander of the Tibet military region, Zhang was present for the formal decision to go to war with India in "self-defense" at the politburo meeting of October 18. Mao raised some issues with the plan, and suggested that they were underestimating the Indian Armed Forces, but Zhang reassured him. Zhang was the People's Liberation Army Ground Force field commander during the Sino-Indian War.

Cultural Revolution
In February 1967, at the beginning of the Cultural Revolution, three divisions of Red Guards tried to oust Zhang Guohua from the Governorship in Lhasa. Using armor, he succeeded in repressing them, and negotiated with the central government to be moved to Sichuan to form a revolutionary committee. He served as the Governor of Sichuan from 1968 to 1972.

References 

1914 births
1972 deaths
People's Liberation Army generals from Jiangxi
People of the Sino-Indian War
Politicians from Ji'an
Chinese Communist Party politicians from Jiangxi
People's Republic of China politicians from Jiangxi
Governors of Sichuan
Political office-holders in Tibet
People of the Republic of China